Glenn A. Tufts (born December 2, 1954 in Middleboro, Massachusetts) is currently a scout for the San Francisco Giants. Previously, he played professionally and managed in the minor leagues.

Playing career
Prior to playing professionally, Tufts attended Bridgewater-Raynham High School. He was drafted in the first round, fifth overall, by the Cleveland Indians in the 1973 amateur draft. 

Tufts began his professional career in 1973, playing for the GCL Indians. In 51 games with them, he batted .194. He missed all of 1974 following a car accident, and in 1975 he hit .270 in 102 games for the San Jose Bees. He split the 1976 season between the Bees and Williamsport Tomahawks, hitting a combined .249 in 62 games. 1977 ended up being his final professional season playing baseball. In 84 games for the Waterloo Indians and Jersey City Indians, he hit only .234.

Overall, Tufts hit .240 in 299 minor league games, over four seasons.

Post playing career
From 1986 to 1993, he was the head coach for Bridgewater State College. In 1992, Tufts managed the Hyannis Mets, a collegiate summer baseball team in the prestigious Cape Cod Baseball League. He was hired as a minor league instructor by the Giants in 1994, coaching the Clinton LumberKings. He managed for three seasons, from 1995 to 1997, and in 1997 he became a scout as well.

Year-By-Year Minor League Managerial Record

References

Living people
1954 births
Cape Cod Baseball League coaches
Minor league baseball managers
Minor league baseball players
People from Middleborough, Massachusetts
San Francisco Giants scouts